Joseph Julian Soria (born August 28, 1986) is a Mexican-American actor best known for his role as Private First Class Hector Cruz in the Lifetime series Army Wives and Pete Ramos in The Oath.

Life and career
Soria was born in Los Angeles, California. His parents are Mexican. He joined the cast of Army Wives in 2012 for season 6.  He was promoted to series regular for season 7 of the top-rated series.

He also starred as the lead antagonist, MC Wyatt, in the Pantelion Films and Olmos Productions film Filly Brown. The film premiered at the 2012 Sundance Film Festival as part of the U.S. Dramatic Competition. Soria plays opposite Gina Rodriguez in the film, which premiered to a limited distribution of 188 theaters on April 19, 2013. Before the film's release, the Filly Brown team mourned the loss of the film's supporting actress, Latin superstar Jenni Rivera, who died in a plane crash, along with six other individuals, near Iturbide, Nuevo León, Mexico, on December 9, 2012. Filly Brown was the fourth film to premiere at the Sundance Film Festival for Soria, his other films include All She Can (2011), High School (2010), and Hamlet 2 (2008). Soria additionally has a lead role the indie film Mission Park (later retitled Line of Duty), which premiered on September 6, 2013, by AMC Theatres.

On June 14, 2013, it was announced that Soria would join Kristen Stewart in Camp X-Ray, a political drama written and directed by Peter Sattler.

He currently stars as Erik Morales in the Netflix original Gentefied.

Filmography

References

External links
 

1986 births
Living people
American male film actors
American male television actors
American male actors of Mexican descent
Male actors from Los Angeles